Kalchirburan (Kälser-Buran) is a rural locality (a village) in Novokalchirovsky Selsoviet, Aurgazinsky District, Bashkortostan, Russia. The population was 318 as of 2010. There are 3 streets.

Geography 
Kalchirburan is located 10 km north of Tolbazy (the district's administrative centre) by road. Novy Kalchir is the nearest rural locality.

References 

Rural localities in Aurgazinsky District